All Saints Episcopal Church is an Episcopal parish located in San Leandro, California and part of the Episcopal Diocese of California. The Reverend Justin Cannon is the current Rector and Bishop Marc Andrus the overseeing bishop.

Beginnings in Oakland, California

In 1860, the Church of the Advent building was constructed at E. 14th Street and 17th Avenue in Oakland, California. Twenty years later, this building was moved a mere seven blocks to a larger lot, located at 12th Avenue and Foothill Boulevard, and was renovated. In March 1883, Mrs. D.B. Hinckley presented the church with a memorial window that was installed in the parish chancel. In 1886, construction of a new larger church began, which was combined with the old church building, and from 1897-1898 numerous alterations occurred. Today, the original structure of the Church of the Advent remains and continues to be used as a parish hall. Since 1927 the congregation has been called Saint James Episcopal Church.

On September 11, 1910 members of the Church of the Advent organized “All Saints Mission.” The cornerstone for the mission church was laid on August 5, 1911 at 96th Avenue and Plymouth Street in Elmhurst, Oakland, California. In September 1911, Church of the Advent donated a memorial window during construction of the All Saints Mission Church. That same month, the first services were conducted by Archdeacon Emery in the newly completed All Saints church.

Emergence in San Leandro, California

On September 10, 1910 a group called Saint Mark’s Guild was formed in San Leandro, California, which held services in private homes. In 1932, Saint Mark’s Guild began renting a cottage and transformed it into a chapel before eventually moving to Odd Fellows Hall (Legion Hall). In 1935, Saint Mark's Guild in San Leandro had experienced notable growth, but they had no church. In Elmhurst, All Saints had a building but church attendance had dwindled. After negotiations between the two congregations, with the assistance of Bishop Parsons, plans were made to move the building to its present location in San Leandro. The move began in December 1935 and was completed in April 1936. At that time, the two congregations merged and became known as All Saints Episcopal Church, San Leandro. The Order of Dedication Services for all Saints was conducted January 26, 1936 by the Venerable W.R. Hodgkin, Archdeacon, followed by the celebration of Holy Communion with the Reverend J.M. Malloch being the celebrant.

Services
All Saints’ primary worship services are celebrations of the Holy Eucharist, held Sunday mornings at 8:00am and 10:15am. In addition to these Sunday services, the community holds services on high feast days including Christmas Eve, Ash Wednesday, Good Friday, and Holy Saturday. Other rites and sacraments celebrated throughout the year include baptism, confirmation, matrimony, funerals and memorial services.

List of rectors

 Rev. Henry T. Praed, 1st rector 1946 – 1960
 Rev. John Phillip Ashey II, 2nd rector 1960 – 1965
 Rev. Gerald Skillicorn, 3rd rector 1965 – 1969
 Rev. Ferdinand D. Saunders, 4th rector 1969 – 1987
 Rev. Dr. Richard A. Swanson, 5th rector 1987 – 2001
 Rev. Dr. Rob Droste, 6th rector 2002 – 2015
 Rev. Justin R. Cannon, 7th rector 2016 – present

References

External links
Official site

Episcopal church buildings in California
Churches in Alameda County, California
Buildings and structures in San Leandro, California